Bruce Beaton St Clair Munro (born 2 June 1959) is a dual nationality English/Australian artist known for producing large immersive site-specific installations, often by massing components in the thousands. Frequently, Munro’s subject matter is his own experience of fleeting moments of rapport with the world and existence in its largest sense, of being part of life’s essential pattern. His reoccurring motif is the use of light on an environmental scale in order to create an emotional response for the viewer.

An artistic diarist, Munro has spent over 30 years collecting and recording ideas and images in his sketchbooks, which he returns to over time for source material. Language, literature, science, and music have also greatly influenced his work.

Life and career 
Munro was born in London, the youngest of the three children of Judith Ames and Brian Munro. His parents divorced in 1965.

In 1977, he completed a Foundation course in Art and Design at Braintree Technical College, and in 1982 graduated from Bristol Polytechnic in Fine Art with a focus on painting. He traveled to Sydney, Australia in 1984, intending it to be a six-month working holiday, but instead staying eight years. In 1988 Munro was granted Australian citizenship under dual nationality with Great Britain.

While working in Australia, Munro was chagrined when a colleague referred to him as having ‘a butterfly mind,’ meaning his mind was unsettled and scattered, but the comment struck a chord. In response, he decided to narrow his vision to the medium of light. The artist said, “when I decided to work in light, almost 30 years ago, I chose it very carefully because I knew I needed some kind of focus. I thought that working in a medium that was very pure and true would simplify my ability to express all the different ideas that filled my head.”

In 1985, Munro started an illuminated display business in Sydney, which he sold in 1988 and went on to work for its new owners, learning about manufacturing and production techniques. He purposely left his fine art ambitions aside, as he reasoned he needed career experience, but while in Australia he made notes and sketches recording moments of condensed connectivity with nature, feeling that those moments of clarity would be worthy subject matter to reconsider through art.

In 1992 Munro and his fiancée, Serena Ludovici, began a camping tour of Australia prior to their planned return to England. While camping at Uluru (Ayers Rock) he conceived of an artwork that would bloom at night, like dormant desert seeds responding to rain, and recorded the idea in his sketchbook. In 1993 he and his wife Serena moved to the country in Dorset, where he intended to make a living as a painter, which proved to be an unrealistic goal. In 1994, his second child was born. Aware of his family commitments, he started a tile business and in 1995 joined Kevin McCloud design studio. In 1996 Munro once again embarked on his own business realizing mostly residential projects in paint, tile, and lighting and began a series of bespoke designs.

In 1999, his father died on 12 August. As a result, Munro was beset with anxiety, fear, and a loss of confidence for six months to a year, and began to think again about simple experiences of connection as source material for making personal work. In 2003 the Munros, now a family of six, purchased Long Knoll, a sixteenth-century derelict farmhouse and outbuildings, with a ten-acre large field bisected by a public footpath. Also in 2003, Harvey Nichols, the London retailer, commissioned a window display of 10,000 illuminated stems.

In 2004 Munro participated in the Victoria and Albert Museum's “Brilliant!” exhibition, using 5,000 of the Harvey Nichols components. He hired two young lads from the nearby village to stake out his first true Field of Light, based on his originating inspiration at Uluru, in the field behind his home. Munro left the illuminated field up from 2004 to 2005, with a sign reading, “Please turn the lights off when you’re finished.”

Munro was then invited to recreate Field of Light at the Eden Project in Cornwall (Winter 2008/9) and participated in the 2010 exhibition “Contemplating the Void: Interventions in the Guggenheim Museum,” at the Solomon R. Guggenheim Museum, New York, NY.  In 2011 he exhibited another iteration of Field of Light at the Holburne Museum in Bath.

In 2022 Munro will present his first museum exhibition in Australia at Heide Museum of Modern Art, "From Sunrise Road".

Selected works and projects 
Field of Light, (2004– ) Munro is best known for site-specific iterative versions of Field of Light, including Forest of Light, 2012,   at Longwood Gardens, Kennett Square, PA, and River of Light, 2013, at Waddesdon Manor, the Rothschild Collection, Buckinghamshire,UK.  Writing about “Forest of Light” in the Washington Post, journalist Adrian Higgins said, "It is the sheer scale of the work that really touches the imagination…“Forest of Light” is strange and touching and authentic. It is a phenomenon of opposites, organic and synthetic, familiar and otherworldly, tangible and dreamlike.”

CDSea (2010) In June 2010, Munro with 140 helpers created an inland sea on Long Knoll field in Wiltshire, using 600,000 recycled compact disks, donated from around the world. The project was inspired by Munro’s memory of the play of light on water one afternoon in the 1980s, as he dreamed beside a beach in Sydney, missing his family a half a world away. The artist has returned to the use of reflected light through CDs in other projects, notably Waterlilies, 2012, at Longwood Gardens, Blue Moon on a Platter and Angel of Light, both 2013, at Waddesdon Manor, the Rothschild Collection and The Ferryman’s Crossing, 2015, Scottsdale Museum of Contemporary Art.

Water Towers (2011– )  In 2010, Munro exhibited an installation of 69 towers, built from plastic bottles of water and fiber optics, at Salisbury Cathedral, Wiltshire, England. The installation, originally inspired by a book Munro read at age twenty-one, Gifts of Unknown Things, by Lyall Watson, has been recreated in site-specific iterations since.

Light Shower (2008– ) In 2008, Munro developed this artwork for a residential commission in Loch Ossian, Scotland and it has been exhibited in its largest configuration in the Spire Crossing nave on Salisbury Cathedral, Wiltshire, England  from 29 November 2010 until January 2011. It has been recreated in site-specific public and private iterations since.

Light and Language (2014– ) In 2014, Munro discovered the work of Korean abstract artist Kim Whanki (1913 - 1974), whose line and mark-making reminded Munro of semaphore; or Morse code transmitted by pulses of light.  He was intrigued that by employing Morse code to translate texts, he could produce both pattern and a decipherable message. Each piece in this series reflects a phrase, words or equations that have meaning to the artist and to the subject matter of the artwork. The series includes Snow, 2014, and …---…SOS shown at Waddesdon Manor, The Ferryman’s Crossing, 2015, Scottsdale Museum of Contemporary Art, Ferryman’s Crossing II and Lighthouse, both 2014, at Hermitage Museum and Gardens. and First Impressions, 2015, Sharjah Museum of Contemporary Art, Sharjah, UAE.

Exhibitions 

Munro first solo exhibition was at Longwood Gardens, the DuPont estate in Kennett Square, PA. It spanned 23 acres and was commissioned to run from 9 June to 29 September 2012. The exhibition received the 2013 American Alliance of Museums Excellence in Exhibition Award – Special Distinction, Aesthetics and Materials. Also in 2012, Munro presented two installations at Waddesdon Manor, the Rothschild Collection, as an introduction to his exhibition residency there, Winter Light, which ran annually in 2013-2015. As a result of these exhibitions, Munro became best known for expansive outdoor installations, working at Cheekwood Botanical Gardens and Museum of Art and Franklin Park Conservatory in 2013; St Andrew Square, Edinburgh, Scotland, Simbionte Festival, Parque Lincoln, Mexico City, and Hermitage Museum and Gardens in 2014; the Atlanta Botanical Garden in 2015; the Minnesota Landscape Arboretum in 2016-2017; and Nicholas Conservatory and Gardens in 2017.

From 3 October 2015 to 8 May 2016, Munro’s work was presented in a cultural collaboration “Desert Radiance,” composed of four solo exhibitions at the Scottsdale Museum of Contemporary Art, Desert Botanical Garden, Scottsdale Public Art, and Lisa Sette Gallery.

Munro’s work has also been presented in urban public locations, including St Andrew’s Square, Edinburgh, Scotland; Simbionte Festival, Parque Lincoln, Mexico City (both 2013); Discovery Green, Houston, Texas (2014; reprised 2015); and Hans Christian Andersen Haven, Odense, Denmark, 2017-2018. Munro’s work was named as among the 49 most compelling public art projects across the United States for the year 2016, an honour awarded by Americans for the Arts’ Public Art Network. During 2017 his work was presented by the City of Gothenburg, Sweden at the City's  garden locations of the Palm House, Trädgårdsföreningen (Garden Society of Gothenburg) and Slottsskogen park. In 2019, Munro's first city-wide exhibition, Tropical Light, opened in Darwin, Northern Territory, Australia, showcasing 8 artworks along a 2.5 kilometer trail.

Concurrently the artist has produced interior installations: Cantus Arcticus at Waddesdon Manor in 2013, Star for Salisbury Cathedral and Between Words II at Bath Spa University in 2014. He participated in the Islamic Arts Festival, Sharjah Art Museum, Sharjah, UAE, in 2015 to 2016.

In 2015, Munro was invited to return to Uluru to mount the largest version of his Field of Light to date, at the place of its first inspiration. In March 2016, Munro and his team installed the immense land art sculpture, Uluru Field of Light covering an area of over 49,000 square meters. The exhibition opened in April 2016 and has since been extended indefinitely.

Munro's work Time and Again was presented at Chatsworth House in Derbyshire as a part of Beyond Limits, an annual exhibition of monumental outdoor sculpture organised by Sotheby's in fall 2016. He exhibited at the Colorado Springs Fine Arts Center and Green Box Arts Festival in 2017. 2018 saw solo exhibitions at Avenue of Honor, Albany, Australia 
 and the Montalvo Arts Center, Saratoga, CA, which premiered the exhibition Stories In Light, a collection of illuminated installations based upon the artist's longheld appreciation for C.S. Lewis' The Chronicles of Narnia. In May 2019, the artist's solo exhibition Field of Light  opened the new arts venue Sensorio in Paso Robles, California.

Personal life 
Munro lives and works in Wiltshire. He and his wife Serena have four children.

See also
 Light art
 Land art

References

External links 
brucemunro.co.uk

1959 births
Living people
Alumni of the University of the West of England, Bristol
Artists from London
English contemporary artists
English installation artists
Light artists
Lighting designers